William Robert Braden (March 11, 1858 – February 14, 1922) was a grocer and political figure in British Columbia. He represented Rossland City from 1909 to 1912 in the Legislative Assembly of British Columbia as a Conservative.

He was born in Cedar Grove, Ontario, the son of Andrew Braden, a native of Ireland, and was educated in Ontario. In 1885, he married Annie Wilkes. He died in Victoria at the age of 63.

References 

1858 births
1922 deaths
British Columbia Conservative Party MLAs
Canadian people of Irish descent